Harry Abbott may refer to:

Fred Abbott (Harry Frederick Abbott, 1874–1935), baseball catcher
Harry Abbott (footballer, born 1883) (1883–?), inside forward for Bolton Wanderers
Harry Abbott (footballer, born 1895) (1895–1968), goalkeeper who played more than 200 Football League matches

See also
Henry Abbott (disambiguation)
Harold Abbott (disambiguation)